Louis Mouchet is an independent film-maker born in Geneva, Switzerland in 1957.

Biography
Louis Mouchet studied history and literature at the University of Geneva and graduated from London International Film School in 1983.

He has directed mainly documentaries, along with shorts, music videos and corporate films for international companies and humanitarian organizations.

Louis Mouchet is the son of the poet Charles Mouchet.

Filmography
 François Simon the Presence (with Ana Simon, 1986). Portrait of Swiss actor François Simon, son of Michel Simon. With the participation of Jeanne Moreau, Daniel Schmid and Paco Ibáñez.
 Adolphe Appia the Visionary  of Invisible (1989). Portrait of stage designer Adolphe Appia.
 The  Jodorowsky Constellation, a portrait of cult film-maker and multitalented artist Alejandro Jodorowsky which ends up in a "self reflective exercise".With the participation of Jean Giraud aka Moebius, Peter Gabriel, Fernando Arrabal and Marcel Marceau.
 The Secret of Secret (2000), film on traditional healers in the Alps.
 Blues Road Movie (2001), film retracing the epic of Blues from Mali to New Orleans, and from Mississippi to Chicago.With Boubacar Traoré, Corey Harris, Koko Taylor, Willie "Big Eyes" Smith, Super Chikan and Bobby Rush.
 Rromani Soul (2008). Following the "Queen of the Gypsies" Esma Redzepova, the film reveals for the first time ever that the true and unique origin of the rroma people is Kannauj in Uttar Pradesh, India.
 Santa Shakti (2017). By drawing a parallel between the Indian Durga Puja festival and other forms of celebrating the Divine feminine, Santa Shakti reveals the Sacred Power beyond languages and religions.
 Seeds to Grow (2017-2020), Web Series. Filmed portraits of personalities whose unique and remarkable careers are a source of inspiration for everyone: Alvin Queen (jazz drummer), Carla-Haddad Mardini (humanitarian leader), Patrick Delarive (serial entrepreneur), Anju Rupal (creator of a sustainable beauty brand).

External links
Louis Mouchet official website

Interview of Louis Mouchet on Rromani Soul

Swiss film directors
1957 births
Living people
Film people from Geneva